A Trick of Fate is a lost 1919 silent film drama directed by Howard Hickman and starring Bessie Barriscale.

Cast
Bessie Barriscale - Anna Gerard/Mary Lee
Gayne Whitman - Richard Crane (*as Alfred Whitman)
George Field - Pierre La Rouge (as George Fields)
Josef Swickard - Raoul Garson (*Joe Swickard)
Joseph J. Dowling - Major Lee (*as Joe Dowling)
Frank Whitson - John Wentworth

References

External links
 A Trick of Fate at IMDb.com

1919 films
American silent feature films
Lost American films
Films directed by Howard C. Hickman
American black-and-white films
Silent American drama films
1919 drama films
Film Booking Offices of America films
1919 lost films
Lost drama films
1910s American films